The 1976 Summer Olympics were held in Montreal, Quebec, Canada; 26 events in swimming were contested.  There was a total of 471 participants from 51 countries competing.

Events

Participating nations
471 swimmers from 51 nations competed.

Medal table

Medal summary

Men's events

Women's events

Gallery of the medalists 
Some of the Olympic medalists in Montreal:

References

 
1976 Summer Olympics events
1976
1976 in swimming